Christopher James Barnett (born June 14, 1986) is an American professional mixed martial artist who competes in the Heavyweight division of the Ultimate Fighting Championship.

Background
Barnett was born in Zaragoza, Spain, where his father was stationed as a United States Air Force captain. Around the age of four, the family returned to the United States and after bouncing around they settled in Georgia. Both of his parents are black belts in Taekwondo, and he started training the martial art around the age of five. Barnett went to Campbellsville University and University of South Florida and graduated with a Bachelor's Degree. At Campbellsville, Barnett competed in Wrestling on a scholarship and began training in Judo. Barnett received an invitation to try out mixed martial arts after showing his moves in a dance battle, and started training immediately.

Mixed martial arts career

Early career
Starting his professional career in 2009, Barnett fought primarily in Xtreme Fighting Championships and started 5–0 with four knockouts. He also fought in other notable Asian organizations, such as Rizin Fighting Federation, Road Fighting Championship, and Inoki Genome Federation.

Ultimate Fighting Championship
After 12 years, Barnett finally got a call from the UFC to replace Askar Mozharov on short notice against Ben Rothwell at UFC Fight Night 188 on May 22, 2021. He lost the bout by submission in the second round.

In September 2021, news surfaced that Barnett had tested positive for marijuana stemming from his UFC debut, and he was suspended for 4.5 months, becoming eligible to return on October 6, 2021.

In his next fight, Barnett fought Gian Villante in Villante's retirement fight at UFC 268 on November 6, 2021 in Madison Square Garden. He won the fight by technical knockout in the second round via spinning wheel kick and punches. The win earned him the Performance of the Night bonus award.

Barnett next faced Martin Buday at UFC Fight Night 206 on April 16, 2022. Barnett lost the fight via technical unanimous decision after being rendered unable to continue due to an unintentional elbow to the back of the head in the third round.

Barnett most recently faced Jake Collier on September 10, 2022 at UFC 279. At the weigh-ins, Barnett weighed in at 267.5 pounds, 1.5 pounds over the non-title heavyweight limit. Barnett was fined 20% of his purse, which went to his opponent Collier. Barnett suffered a knockdown and heavy ground and pound in the first, however he rallied and won the fight via TKO in the second round.

Barnett is scheduled to face Chase Sherman on April 8, 2023, at UFC 287.

Personal life
Barnett's wife died in May of 2022 after a battle with encephalitis. Barnett and his late wife have a daughter and a son.

Championships and accomplishments
 Ultimate Fighting Championship
 Performance of the Night (one time) vs. Gian Villante
Island Fights
IF Super Heavyweight Championship (one time)
One successful title defense

Mixed martial arts record

|-
|Win
|align=center|23–8
|Jake Collier
|TKO (punches)
|UFC 279
|
|align=center|2
|align=center|2:24
|Las Vegas, Nevada, United States
|
|-
|Loss
|align=center|22–8
|Martin Buday
|Technical Decision (unanimous)
|UFC on ESPN: Luque vs. Muhammad 2
|
|align=center|3
|align=center|1:37
|Las Vegas, Nevada, United States
|
|-
|Win
|align=center|22–7
|Gian Villante
|TKO (spinning wheel kick and punches)
|UFC 268
|
|align=center|2
|align=center|2:23
|New York City, New York, United States
|
|-
|Loss
|align=center|21–7
|Ben Rothwell
|Submission (guillotine choke)
|UFC Fight Night: Font vs. Garbrandt
|
|align=center|2
|align=center|2:07
|Las Vegas, Nevada, United States
|
|-
|Win
|align=center|21–6
|Ahmed Tijani Shehu
|TKO (punches)
|UAE Warriors 13
|
|align=center|1
|align=center|0:58
|Abu Dhabi, United Arab Emirates
|
|-
|Win
|align=center|20–6
|Rashaun Jackson
|Decision (split)
|Island Fights 60
|
|align=center|3
|align=center|5:00
|Columbus, Georgia, United States
|
|-
|Win
|align=center|19–6
|Yoon Jae Shim
|KO (punch)
|Road FC 55
|
|align=center|1
|align=center|3:44
|Daegu, South Korea
|
|-
|Win
|align=center|18–6
|Robert Neal
|Decision (unanimous)
|Island Fights 52
|
|align=center|3
|align=center|5:00
|Pensacola, Florida, United States
|
|-
|Win
|align=center|17–6
|Alexandru Lungu
|TKO (punches)
|Road FC 47
|
|align=center|1
|align=center|2:34
|Beijing, China
|
|-
|Win
|align=center|16–6
|Yoon Jae Shim
|TKO (punches)
|Road FC 45
|
|align=center|2
|align=center|3:33
|Seoul, South Korea
|
|-
|Loss
|align=center|15–6
|Alex Nicholson
|KO (elbow)
|Island Fights 42
|
|align=center|1
|align=center|0:40
|Pensacola, Florida, United States
|
|-
|Loss
|align=center|15–5
|Hyun Man Myung
|KO (punch)
|Road FC 41
|
|align=center|2
|align=center|1:53
|Wanju, South Korea
|
|-
|Loss
|align=center|15–4
|Hyun Man Myung
|TKO (doctor stoppage)
|Road FC 38
|
|align=center|1
|align=center|2:17
|Seoul, South Korea
|
|-
|Win
|align=center|15–3
|Frank Tate
|Decision (split)
|Island Fights 39
|
|align=center|3
|align=center|5:00
|Pensacola, Florida, United States
|
|-
|Loss
|align=center|14–3
|Kirill Sidelnikov
|Decision (split)
|Rizin 1
|
|align=center|3
|align=center|5:00
|Nagoya, Japan
|
|-
|Win
|align=center|14–2
|Shinichi Suzukawa
|TKO (punches)
|Inoki Bom-Ba-Ye 2015
|
|align=center|1
|align=center|1:44
|Sumida, Japan
|
|-
|Loss
|align=center|13–2
|Oli Thompson
|Decision (unanimous)
|Inoki Genome Fight 4
|
|align=center|2
|align=center|5:00
|Sumida, Japan
|
|-
|Win
|align=center|13–1
|Emil Zahariev
|KO (spinning back kick to the body)
|Inoki Genome Fight 3
|
|align=center|2
|align=center|2:58
|Sumida, Japan
|
|-
|Win
|align=center|12–1
|Shinichi Suzukawa
|TKO (punches)
|Inoki Bom-Ba-Ye 2014
|
|align=center|1
|align=center|1:57
|Sumida, Japan
|
|-
| Win
| align=center|11–1
|Jon Hill
| TKO (punches)
| Island Fights 30
| 
| align=center| 1
| align=center| 0:30
| Pensacola, Florida, United States
|
|-
| Win
| align=center| 10–1
| Travis Wiuff
|TKO (punches)
|Inoki Genome Fight 2
|
|align=center|2
|align=center|0:27
|Sumida, Japan
|
|-
| Win
| align=center| 9–1
| Richard White
|TKO (punches)
|Island Fights 28
| 
|align=center|1
|align=center|4:57
|Pensacola, Florida, United States
|
|-
| Win
| align=center| 8–1
| Demoreo Dennis
|TKO (punches)
|Island Fights 27
|
|align=center|2
|align=center|1:13
|Pensacola, Florida, United States
|
|-
| Win
| align=center| 7–1
| Walt Harris
|Decision (unanimous)
|World Extreme Fighting 46
|
|align=center|3
|align=center|5:00
|Orlando, Florida, United States
|
|-
| Win
| align=center|6–1
| Mario Rinaldi
|TKO (punches)
|XFC 13
| 
|align=center|2
|align=center|1:44
| Tampa, Florida, United States
|
|-
| Loss
| align=center|5–1
|Eric Prindle
|Decision (majority)
|Martial Combat 12
|
|align=center|3
|align=center|5:00
|Sentosa, Singapore
|
|-
| Win
| align=center|5–0
|Jay White
|KO (punches)
|XFC 11
|
|align=center|1
|align=center|4:39
|Tampa, Florida, United States
|
|-
| Win
| align=center|4–0
| Joel Wyatt
|TKO (punches)
|WCC 2
|
|align=center|2
|align=center|0:43
|Allentown, Pennsylvania, United States
|
|-
| Win
| align=center|3–0
| Kenny Garner
|TKO (punches)
|XFC 10
|
| align=center|3
| align=center|1:36
|Tampa, Florida, United States
|
|-
| Win
| align=center| 2–0
| Daniel Perez
| TKO (punches)
|XFC 9
|
| align=center|2
| align=center|0:47
|Tampa, Florida, United States
|
|-
| Win
| align=center|1–0
| Johnathan Ivey
| Decision (unanimous)
|XFC 8
|
|align=center|3
|align=center|5:00
|Knoxville, Tennessee, United States
|

Submission grappling record 
{| class="wikitable sortable" style="font-size:80%; text-align:left;"
|-
| colspan=8 style="text-align:center;" | 1 Matches, 0 Wins, 1 Losses, 0 Draws
|-
!  Result
!  Rec.
!  Opponent
!  Method
!  text-center| Event
!  Date
!  Division
!  Location
|-
| Loss ||align=center|0–1||  Yoel Romero || Submission (Kimura) || rowspan=2|Dean Toole Promotions || rowspan=2|June 15, 2019 || Openweight ||rowspan=2|  Pensacola, Florida

Professional boxing record

See also 
 List of current UFC fighters
 List of male mixed martial artists

References

External links
  
 

1986 births
Living people
Sportspeople from Zaragoza
American male boxers
African-American boxers
Boxers from Florida
Mixed martial artists from Florida
Mixed martial artists utilizing taekwondo
Mixed martial artists utilizing boxing
Mixed martial artists utilizing collegiate wrestling
Mixed martial artists utilizing judo
American male taekwondo practitioners
American male sport wrestlers
Amateur wrestlers
American male judoka
American male mixed martial artists
Heavyweight mixed martial artists
Ultimate Fighting Championship male fighters